The Super League Greece 1 ( 1), or Super League 1 Stoiximan for sponsorship reasons, is the highest professional association football league in Greece. The league was formed on 16 July 2006 and replaced Alpha Ethniki at the top of the Greek football league system. It consists of 14 teams and runs from August to May, with teams playing 26 games.

As of May 2022, Super League Greece is ranked 15th in the UEFA ranking of leagues, based on performances in European competitions over the last five years.
 
Since the foundation of the first official Panhellenic Championship in 1927, only six clubs have won the title. The current champions are Olympiacos, based in Piraeus.

History

Origins 
Between 1905 and 1912, a Panhellenic Championship was organised by the Hellenic Association of Amateur Athletics (SEGAS). This championship was actually a local tournament among clubs from Athens and Piraeus.

After the Balkan Wars and World War I, two football associations were formed, one organising a football league in Athens and Piraeus, and one doing the same in Thessaloniki. These were the Athens-Piraeus FCA (EPSAP) and the Macedonia FCA (EPSM). In 1923, a Panhellenic Champion was determined by a play-off game between the Athens-Piraeus and the Thessaloniki champions. Peiraikos Syndesmos won 3–1 against Aris. This panhellenic final was not repeated the following year as the EPSAP was split into the Athens FCA (EPSA) and Piraeus FCA (EPSP) following a dispute.

Panhellenic Championship
On November 14, 1926, the Hellenic Football Federation is founded and organizes the first Panhellenic Championship in the period 1927-28, in which, however, Olympiacos, Panathinaikos and AEK Athens did not participate due to conflicts with the EPO.

The initial events were held with teams from Athens, Piraeus and Thessaloniki, excluding the provincial ones. Previously, the local championships of the cities were held and in the final phase, sometimes only the first ones qualified, sometimes the first two or the first three teams. In the championship of 1938-39, which was held in two groups, teams outside Athens-Thessaloniki (Doxa Drama, AEK Kavala and Filippi Kavala) participated for the first time. The maiden presence of provincial teams in a single group of the Panhellenic Championship took place in 1953-54 with the participation of Panachaiki from Southern Greece and Niki Volou from Central and Northern Greece.

Α΄ National division 
In 1959 the Alpha Ethniki – the precursor of the current Super League – was set up as a national round-robin tournament.
After several months of talks, the 1959–60 championship was the first nationwide league competition. It started on Sunday 25 October 1959 with the participation of 16 teams.
The creation of a championship in the form of a single permanent national division rather than the way they have been held until then with the participation of the teams selected by the local competitions was a requirement of both the State and UEFA.
The first wished to establish a fixed number of matches every Sunday in Greece to stimulate interest in PRO-PO while UEFA wished to nominate national champions with strict criteria and through joint events for all states.
The Hellenic Football Federation (HFF) was obliged to proceed to the abolition of the competitions of the Football Clubs Associations (EPS) of Greece as qualifying stages for the Pan-Hellenic Championship. The first place was taken by Alpha Ethniki, a single division with clubs from all over the Greek territory and a stable participation, with the exception of those who would be relegated at the end of the season.
The initial design provided for a number of teams well above the 10th of the 1958–59 Pan-Hellenic Championship and in particular 18 which, as the expanded division calendar would cover almost all the available dates of the year, would no longer participate in its local competitions their EPSs.
Those would be the qualifier for the upcoming national division and not the participation in the final round of the current championship, so their significance was significantly reduced.
On Saturday, 10 October 1959 at the General Assembly of the HFF, ie with the participation of all the members of the Association of Football Associations and in the presence of the General Secretariat of Sports (GGA) and representatives of the Karamanlis government, became the first national division of Greek football. The 1st game was set for 15 days.
According to the general Assembly of HFF on 29 August 1959, it was decided that the newly created Alpha Ethniki would consist of 18 teams, with their determination being made in accordance with the positions in the local EPS competitions in the period 1958–59.
The HFF, at its decisive General Assembly on Saturday, 10 October, decided to reduce the number of teams to 16 so that the racing program will not be extended in the summer.
After the end of the first event in the summer of 1960, the teams did not increase despite HFF's initial intention, with the number 16 being considered the ideal for a championship in Greece and only 18 in 1967.

The teams that participated in the first championship of the Alpha Ethniki were the following:
The top four of the Athens FCA Championship: Panathinaikos, Panionios, AEK Athens and Apollon Smyrnis.
The top four of the Piraeus FCA Championship: Olympiacos, Ethnikos Piraeus, AE Nikaia and Proodeftiki.
The top four of the Macedonia FCA (Thessaloniki) Championship: Aris, PAOK, Apollon Kalamarias and Iraklis.
The top two of the North Group of the Regional Championship: Doxa Drama and Megas Alexandros Katerini.
The first of the two Sub-Groups of the South Regional Championship: Pankorinthiakos and Panegialios.
On 25 October 1959, the Alpha Ethniki was launched. Panathinaikos won the first Alpha Ethniki's Championship, which became the champion of Greece for the fourth time in his history. He scored at 79 points with AEK Athens and beat 2–1 in the barrage, a match where he needed only a tie result in the neutral Karaiskakis Stadium.
In such a case, after the half-hour extension, the competition announcement set the best goal difference. Through barrage and with the same score was also the third place for the demotion, with the winner Panegialios to overtake Pankorinthiakos again in the event of a draw. The scoring system was 3p the win, 2p the draw, 1p the defeat.

The next years 
Time has been relentless for some teams that have participated in the first league of the Alpha Ethniki. The historic Ethnikos Piraeus, cup winner of Greece in 1933, participates in the Gamma Ethniki, as well as Proodeftiki while AE Nikaia participates in the local championship of Piraeus.
Apollon Kalamaria, Doxa Drama and Iraklis are fighting in the Beta Ethniki, while Pankorinthiakos, a few years after joining Alpha Ethniki, merged with Aris Korinthos and created PAS Korinthos, which reached the Alpha Ethniki at the 1990s and is now participating in the Gamma Ethniki.
Megas Alexandros Katerini is the ancestor of Pierikos. In 1961, they merged with Olympos Katerini and created Pierikos who plays in the Gamma Ethniki.

On 19 January 1979 a bill was passed in the Hellenic Parliament under which football clubs became Football Incorporated Companies (PAE or ΠΑΕ in Greek).  The Association of Football Incorporated Companies (EPAE, ΕΠΑΕ in Greek), under the supervision of the HFF, has since held the responsibility to hold the championship, with Makis Ithakisios being elected its first president. 
Initially the shares were owned by the sports union to which the football club belonged. Yet soon after, prominent Greek businessmen (shipowners, oil magnates, bankers etc.) began acquiring the newly formed PAEs by buying the majority of their shares, and then increasing their share capital, thus turning Greek football into a fully commercialised and highly profitable business for the decades to come.

For a single racing season, 2000–01, the championship is renamed "Upper Category".

Rename 
On 16 July 2006, was founded the copartnership Super League. Members of the copartnership are the PAE's that have the right to participate in the professional football championship of the First Division. The main activity of the copartnership is the organization and conduct of the First Division's Championship according to the regulations and decisions of the Hellenic Football Federation (HFF) and the supreme international football confederations (UEFA, FIFA).

Competition format
At present, 14 clubs compete in the Super League, playing each other in a 26-game home and away series. At the end of the season, the top 6 clubs face each other in a 10-game championship round to decide the Super League champions but also the teams to enter the UEFA Champions League and the UEFA Europa Conference League.

The bottom 8 clubs face each other in play-outs to decide who gets relegated to Super League 2. In their place, the top two teams from Super League 2 are promoted. The number of teams to be relegated may change, depending on a licensing procedure that takes place at the end of the regular season.

The Super League is currently entitled to one entrant into the UEFA Champions League. The Champion currently enters the first qualifying round through the champion path. The three UEFA Europa Conference League spots go to the teams that finished 2nd to 3rd, with a European berth for the Greek Cup winner.

Clubs

2022–23 season
The following 14 clubs will compete in the Super League 1 during the 2022–23 season.

Champions

Names of the championship through the years
1905–06 to 1926–27: SEGAS Championship and Greece FCA Championship (not counted by HFF)
1927–28 to 1958–59: HFF Panhellenic Championship
1959–60 to 2005–06: Alpha Ethniki
2006–07 to present: Super League Greece

SEGAS and FCA championships

Greek Championship 

Panhellenic Championship
 1927–28 Aris (1)
 1928–29  Not held
 1929–30 Panathinaikos (1)
 1930–31 Olympiacos (1)
 1931–32 Aris (2)
 1932–33 Olympiacos (2)
 1933–34 Olympiacos (3)
 1934–35 Not finished
 1935–36 Olympiacos (4)
 1936–37 Olympiacos (5)
 1937–38 Olympiacos (6)
 1938–39 AEK (1)
 1939–40 AEK (2)
 1940–41  Not finished (WW2)
 1941–42  Not held (WW2)
 1942–43  Not held (WW2)
 1943–44  Not held (WW2)
 1944–45  Not held (WW2)
 1945–46 Aris (3)
 1946–47 Olympiacos (7)
 1947–48 Olympiacos (8)
 1948–49 Panathinaikos (2)
 1950–51 Olympiacos (9)
 1951–52  Not Held
 1952–53 Panathinaikos (3)
 1953–54 Olympiacos (10)
 1954–55 Olympiacos (11)
 1955–56 Olympiacos (12)
 1956–57 Olympiacos (13)
 1957–58 Olympiacos (14)
 1958–59 Olympiacos (15)

National League (Alpha Ethniki)
 1959–60 Panathinaikos (4)
 1960–61 Panathinaikos (5)
 1961–62 Panathinaikos (6)
 1962–63 AEK (3)
 1963–64 Panathinaikos (7)
 1964–65 Panathinaikos (8)
 1965–66 Olympiacos (16)
 1966–67 Olympiacos (17)
 1967–68 AEK (4)
 1968–69 Panathinaikos (9)
 1969–70 Panathinaikos (10)
 1970–71 AEK (5)
 1971–72 Panathinaikos (11)
 1972–73 Olympiacos (18)
 1973–74 Olympiacos (19)
 1974–75 Olympiacos (20)
 1975–76 PAOK (1)
 1976–77 Panathinaikos (12)
 1977–78 AEK (6)
 1978–79 AEK (7)

Professional League (A'Eth./Sup.League)
 1979–80 Olympiacos (21)
 1980–81 Olympiacos (22)
 1981–82 Olympiacos (23)
 1982–83 Olympiacos (24)
 1983–84 Panathinaikos (13)
 1984–85 PAOK (2)
 1985–86 Panathinaikos (14)
 1986–87 Olympiacos (25)
 1987–88 Larissa (1)
 1988–89 AEK (8)

 1989–90 Panathinaikos (15)
 1990–91 Panathinaikos (16)
 1991–92 AEK (9)
 1992–93 AEK (10)
 1993–94 AEK (11)
 1994–95 Panathinaikos (17)
 1995–96 Panathinaikos (18)
 1996–97 Olympiacos (26)
 1997–98 Olympiacos (27)
 1998–99 Olympiacos (28)
 1999–00 Olympiacos (29)
 2000–01 Olympiacos (30)
 2001–02 Olympiacos (31)
 2002–03 Olympiacos (32)
 2003–04 Panathinaikos (19)
 2004–05 Olympiacos (33)
 2005–06 Olympiacos (34)
 2006–07 Olympiacos (35)
 2007–08 Olympiacos (36)
 2008–09 Olympiacos (37)
 2009–10 Panathinaikos (20)
 2010–11 Olympiacos (38)
 2011–12 Olympiacos (39)
 2012–13 Olympiacos (40)
 2013–14 Olympiacos (41)
 2014–15 Olympiacos (42)
 2015–16 Olympiacos (43)
 2016–17 Olympiacos (44)
 2017–18 AEK (12)
 2018–19 PAOK (3)
 2019–20 Olympiacos (45)
 2020–21 Olympiacos (46)
 2021–22 Olympiacos (47)

Source: epo.gr

Performance by club (1927–)

Performance by club (1959–) 
* Season 1959–60 marked the beginning of the Alpha Ethniki – the precursor of the current Super League – as a national round-robin tournament.

Performance by city (1927–) 
The six clubs that have won the championship are from a total of four cities:

Performance by region (1927–) 
The six clubs that have won the championship are from a total of three regions:

Statistics

Top three ranking (1959–present)

Seasons in Alpha Ethniki and Super League Greece
The number of seasons that each team (in alphabetical order) has played in the top division from 1959–60 until 2022–23. A total of 69 teams had competed in at least one season at the top division. Olympiacos, Panathinaikos and PAOK are the only teams to have played in the top division in every season since the league's inception in its modern form. The teams in bold participate in the 2022–23 Super League.

APOEL avoided relegation in the 1973–74 season, but were forced to play in the Cypriot A Division the following season due to the Turkish invasion of Cyprus. Hence they are the only team to have played a single season in the Greek league and not been relegated.

Top Division Table (since 1959–60) 
This index is an overall record of all match results, points, and goals of the best ten teams that has played in Alpha Ethniki and Super League championships since 1959–60. The table is correct as of the end of the 2021–22 season. Points are based on 3–1–0 and no deductions are counted.

Per geographic region 

All the geographic regions of Greece have been represented by at least one club in the first national division. Central Greece has had the strongest presence with 26 clubs overall, of which 21 come from Attica alone. Central Greece, Macedonia and the Peloponnese together contain almost three-quarters of the clubs that participated in the top flight. Between 1967 and 1974, the Cypriot champion also participated in the Greek top competition, and five different Cypriot clubs participated during those years. The Greek islands of Rhodes, Lesbos and Corfu have also been represented. A total of 73 clubs have participated at the first tier so far.

Top scorers and appearances

Golden Star 
Based on an idea of Umberto Agnelli, the honor of Golden Star for Sports Excellence was introduced to recognize sides that have won multiple championships or other honours by the display of gold stars on their team badges and jerseys.

The current officially sanctioned Super League stars are:
    Olympiacos received in 2012–13
  Panathinaikos received in 2009–10
 AEK received in 1992–93

Greek football clubs in European competitions

UEFA ranking

Country rankings
As of 29 May 2022, the Greek Super League ranks 15th in the UEFA coefficient database, with 28.200 points.

Club rankings

Broadcasting rights 
Nova Sports (premium channel) have taken the broadcasting rights for the home games of six teams of the Super League. The teams are Aris, Asteras Tripolis, Atromitos, Levadiakos, PAOK and PAS Giannina.
Cosmote Sport (also a premium channel) have taken the broadcasting rights for the home games of eight teams of the Super League. The teams are AEK Athens, Ionikos, Lamia, OFI, Olympiacos, Panathinaikos, Panetolikos and Volos.

Eurosport has pan-European broadcasting rights for the Super League (except Greece and Portugal).

South Korean OTT Coupang Play has taken the broadcasting rights for Olympiakos matches.

Sponsorship 
From 2007 to 2017, the Super League had title sponsorship rights sold to one company, which were OPAP. From 2017 until 2019, the Super League has title sponsorship rights sold to the company Souroti.

OPAP' deal with the Super League expired at the end of the 2016–17 season. The Super League announced on 20 July 2017 that the new title sponsorship deal for the Super League was with the Souroti company.

As well as sponsorship for the league itself, the Super League has a number of official partners and suppliers. The official ball supplier for the league is Nike. Also, Panini has held the licence to produce collectables for the Super League since 2008 (except 2018–19 season), including stickers (for their sticker album) and trading cards. On 28 January 2023 Stoiximan became the official sponsor of the league.

See also 
Greek football league system
Greek football champions
List of Greek football championship top scorers
Greek Superleague Best Greek Player
List of foreign football players in Super League Greece
List of sports attendance figures — the Super League in a global context

References

External links 
 Official website 
 Super League at Curlie (based on DMOZ)

 
Professional sports leagues in Greece
Greece
1
1959 establishments in Greece
1927 establishments in Greece
Sports leagues established in 1959
Sports leagues established in 1927
Football
it:Campionato greco di calcio